Paulus "Paul" Bunschoten (10 October 1933, Koog aan de Zaan - 27 December 1994, Wormerveer) was a Dutch sprint canoer who competed in the late 1960s. He was eliminated in the semifinals of the K-4 1000 m event at the 1968 Summer Olympics in Mexico City.

References
Sports-reference.com profile

1933 births
1994 deaths
Canoeists at the 1968 Summer Olympics
Dutch male canoeists
Olympic canoeists of the Netherlands
Sportspeople from Zaanstad
20th-century Dutch people